Hope Downs is the debut studio album by the Australian indie rock band Rolling Blackouts Coastal Fever. It was released on 15 June 2018, through Sub Pop, which peaked at No. 24 on the ARIA Albums Chart. The title refers to the Hope Downs mine, which, according to the band, "refers to the feeling of standing at the edge of the void of the big unknown, and finding something to hold on to". The songs in the album generally have a theme of being alone. Critic Andy Cush says the album presents serene environments, calling it a "brief vacation".

Reception

Hope Downs received universal acclaim in reviews from critics. Juan Edgardo Rodriguez of No Ripcord and Simon Vozick-Levinson of Rolling Stone praised the high quality of all of the songs. Critic Adam Turner-Heffer of Under the Radar wrote "perhaps the only disappointment here is that their sound doesn't feel particularly expanded upon in the long-player format". Despite this, Turner-Heffer considers Hope Downs an impressive debut album.

Track list

Accolades

References

2018 debut albums
Rolling Blackouts Coastal Fever albums
Sub Pop albums